Nobunari is a masculine Japanese given name. Notable people with the name include:

 Naitō Nobunari, samurai
 Nobunari Oda, figure skater

Japanese masculine given names